Marquess of Oquendo is a hereditary title in the Peerage of Spain, granted in 1889 by Queen María Cristina in the name of his son Alfonso XIII to José María Narváez, 2nd Duke of Valencia and the nephew of Ramón María Narváez, 1st Duke of Valencia. The name refers to Antonio de Oquendo, an ancestor of the 1st Marquess.

Marquesses of Oquendo

José María Narváez y Porcel, 1st Marquess of Oquendo
Ramón María Narváez y del Águila, 2nd Marquess of Oquendo
Luis María Narváez y Ulloa, 3rd Marquess of Oquendo
Ramón María Narváez y Coello de Portugal 4th Marquess of Oquendo
Luis Narváez y Rojas, 5th Marquess of Oquendo

See also
Ramón María Narváez, 1st Duke of Valencia

References

Marquesses of Spain
Lists of Spanish nobility
Noble titles created in 1889